Erik Daniel Centeno (born June 29, 2002) is an American professional soccer player who plays as a right-back for Atlanta United of Major League Soccer.

Career

Youth and college
Centeno attended high school soccer at Weston Ranch High School, also playing club soccer for Sacramento Republic from 2015 to 2019, before moving to the FC Dallas academy. He returned to Sacramento Republic in 2021, signing a USL academy contract with the team, but didn't make a first-team appearance.

In 2021, Centeno attended University of the Pacific to play college soccer. He went on to make 16 appearances in his freshman season, scoring six goals and tallying five assists for the Tigers, garnering first-team All-West Coast Conference and the conference's Freshman of the Year honors after leading the Tigers in points and tying for the team lead in goals. In January 2022, it was announced Centeno would leave college early and had signed a Generation Adidas contract to enter the 2022 MLS SuperDraft.

Professional
On January 11, 2022, Centeno was selected 19th overall in the 2022 MLS SuperDraft by Atlanta United. On February 25, 2022, it was announced Centeno would spend time with Atlanta United 2, the club's USL Championship team. He made his professional debut on March 12, 2022, starting against Louisville City.

Personal life
Born in the United States, Centeno is of Mexican descent.

References

External links
Pacific Tigers profile
Atlanta United profile

2002 births
Living people
American soccer players
Association football forwards
Atlanta United FC draft picks
Atlanta United FC players
Atlanta United 2 players
Pacific Tigers men's soccer players
People from Stockton, California
Sacramento Republic FC players
Soccer players from California
USL Championship players